Honourable Fateema Mohammed  was born to the family of Mr and Mrs Audu. Mohammed in Borno State. She is a Nigerian politician and member of the Ifako-Ijaiye constituency in Lagos State, Nigeria. Convener/Founder of Fateema Mohammed Foundation.

Education and personal life
She attended Command Children School, Bonny Camp Lagos, Command Secondary School, Ipaja before proceeding to Ahmadu Bello University, Zaria. She is a graduate of Microbiology from Ahmadu Bello University, Zaria.

Political career
A member of the Ifako-Ijaye constituency in Lagos State. Fatima Mohammed started her political foray in 1999 with Alliance for Democracy (AD) where she served actively in various assignments including as PRS in the then Bola Ahmed Tinubu Campaign Organization (BATCO). She was the arrowhead of Jimi Agbaje gubernatorial campaign in 2007.

She was a member of Jimi Agbaje Campaign Team, Lagos State (PDP Gubernatorial Candidate 2007). She was the coordinator of Aeroland Campaign Team (Senate in 2015). Director General, Atikunation – Atiku Support group for 2019 presidential election, 2017 till Date. Mohammed has openly declared support to Atiku Abubakar to be the winner of the upcoming 2019 general election in Nigeria.

References

Members of the House of Representatives (Nigeria)
Yoruba politicians
Living people
Residents of Lagos
Ahmadu Bello University alumni
Year of birth missing (living people)